H1ghlander is an autonomous vehicle. Created by Carnegie Mellon University's Red Team, it is a heavily modified 1999 HUMMER H1. It competed in the 2005 DARPA Grand Challenge.

The sensors used by H1ghlander include LIDAR laser-ranging units, one steerable LIDAR (in the globe on top), GPS and an inertial navigation system.  The GPS/INS system was an Applanix POS/LV system.

DARPA Grand Challenge
H1ghlander competed in the 2005 DARPA Grand Challenge on October 8, qualifying in the pole position and finished in 7 hours and 14 minutes, placing 3rd out of the five vehicles to complete the 132 mile (212 km) course. It was preceded, in second place, by Sandstorm, its sister vehicle.

Cultural references
The Hummer driven by Denzel Washington in the movie Déjà Vu was heavily based on H1ghlander, sharing a similar gimbal dome on the top, SICK laser sensors in the same positions, a camera tube on the side of the vehicle, and many other visual similarities.  See IMDB Trivia for Déjà Vu.

See also

 Driverless car

References

External links
 Carnegie Mellon Red Team Racing

Experimental self-driving cars
Carnegie Mellon University
DARPA Grand Challenge